Sorkh Lijeh (also Romanized as Sorkh Lījeh and Sarkhalījeh; also known as Sork’ehlīj, Sorkheh Līj, Sorkheh Lījeh, and Sorkheh Lizeh) is a village in Giyan Rural District, Giyan District, Nahavand County, Hamadan Province, Iran. At the 2006 census, its population was 199, in 48 families.

References 

Populated places in Nahavand County